V538 Carinae is a variable star in the constellation of Carina, and a possible red supergiant. If this star replaced the Sun in the  Solar System, its photosphere would at least engulf the orbit of Mars.

Properties
Its distance is uncertain. Calculations based on the Gaia DR2 parallax with temperatures and bolometric corrections inferred from Gaia colours give an even larger radius above .

Some studies suggest that this star is a luminous AGB star and a long-period variable, instead of a supergiant.  It is classified in the General Catalogue of Variable Stars as a semiregular variable star of type SRb, indicating a cool pulsating giant star, with a possible period of 655 days.  Its brightness varies between extremes of magnitude 7.7 and 9.2.

Notes

References

Semiregular variable stars
Carinae, V538
M-type supergiants
M-type bright giants
098658
Carina (constellation)
055355
TIC objects